Planet of the Apes is a film and media franchise.

Planet of the Apes may also refer to:

Planet of the Apes media
 Planet of the Apes (novel), a 1963 science fiction novel by Pierre Boulle that initiated the franchise
 Planet of the Apes (1968 film), the first film in the franchise
 Beneath the Planet of the Apes (1970), the second film in the franchise
 Escape from the Planet of the Apes (1971), the third film in the franchise
 Conquest of the Planet of the Apes (1972), the fourth film in the franchise
 Battle for the Planet of the Apes (1973), the fifth film in the franchise
 Planet of the Apes (TV series), a 1974 television series based on the 1968 film and sequels
 Planet of the Apes (2001 film), a remake of the first film and the sixth film in the franchise
 Rise of the Planet of the Apes (2011), the seventh film in the franchise
 Dawn of the Planet of the Apes (2014), the eighth film in the franchise
 War for the Planet of the Apes (2017), the ninth film in the franchise
 Planet of the Apes (comics), comics tie-ins to the franchise
 Planet of the Apes (video game), a 2001 video game

Other
 Planet of the Apes: Best of Guano Apes, a 2004 greatest hits album by Guano Apes
 Planet of the Apes: The Documentary, a 2005 documentary DVD on Guano Apes
 "Planet of the Apes", a 2000 song by Mindless Self Indulgence from Frankenstein Girls Will Seem Strangely Sexy
 "Planet of the Apes", a 2011 song by the Devin Townsend Project from Deconstruction

See also

 
 Planet of da Apes, an album by Da Lench Mob
 Planet of the Apps, American reality show
 Planet of the Apemen: Battle for Earth, 2011 UK BBC TV series
 Apeworld, setting found in the RPG Terra Primate
 Monkey Planet (disambiguation)